, also known as Don Don Donki, is a Japanese multinational discount store chain. As of 2022, it has over 160 locations throughout Japan, 15 in Singapore, 9 in Hong Kong, 6 in Thailand, 3 in Hawaii and Malaysia, 2 in Taiwan, 1 in Macau and 1 planned in Guam (coming soon).

It provides a wide range of products, from basic groceries to electronics and clothing. The store is well known in Japan and Singapore and is often referred to by its shortened name . Since then, the usage of the "Donki" label for the store has become more commonly used beyond the two countries that have the store. Distinctly, Don Quijote tends to keep very late hours for Japanese retailing (to 3 or 5am, or even 24 hours) and it packs its goods from ceiling to floor in a distinct merchandising strategy.

History

Origins
Founded by Takao Yasuda, Don Quijote opened its first store in Suginami, Tokyo in September 1980 under its original name, Just Co. Originally a retail store, Just Co. quickly switched to wholesale in 1982.

The company opened its first "Don Quijote" named store in Fuchu, Tokyo in March 1989. With the name change, the store also changed its primary business from wholesale to retail. It was not until 1995, six years later, that Just Co. followed suit and it changed its corporate name to Don Quijote Co., Ltd as well. In June 1998, the company was listed on the Tokyo Stock Exchange.

As one of the leading discount stores in Japan, the end of the Japanese economic bubble didn't severely affect the company. Instead, the sudden economic uncertainty caused the Japanese public to become more thrifty and therefore helped to boost sales at its stores during the early 1990s.

In 2005, idol group AKB48 opened its theater on the eighth floor of the Don Quijote Akihabara Outlet in Tokyo. Also that year, a Ferris wheel opened at the facade of the Don Quijote Dōtonbori branch in Osaka.

In October 2007, Don Quijote purchased the ailing Nagasakiya chain for 140 billion yen. This store and 3 other group companies went defunct in Oct 2017 as creditors have pulled the plug on their combined 432 billion yen of debts.  Creditors continue to bankroll the rest of the group.

On June 28, 2017, PAQ, which operated Honolulu-based Times, Big Save and Shima, under the subsidiary QSI, Inc., announced that it had sold the 24 stores it owns in Hawaii to Honolulu-based Don Quijote (USA), using an executed stock purchase agreement with the sale closing in the 3rd quarter of 2017. The deal will combine Times with three Don Quijote stores and two Marukai stores on Oahu. In a statement from Edwin Sawai, president of Don Quijote (USA) Co., Ltd. and Marukai Hawaii Co. Ltd., he said that “The opportunity to welcome the Times Supermarket family of stores and their employees to our ohana is exciting for us,” and added that “We are confident that we will successfully work together, share ideas and learn from each other's combined experiences to best serve Hawaii. For more than 68 years, Times Supermarket has been a local favorite and pillar of Hawaii's retail community. We look forward to continuing their history and success in the islands.”

Further expansions

Singapore
Don Quijote opened its first Southeast Asian store at Orchard Central, Singapore, on December 1, 2017. These stores are branded "Don Don Donki" as the Don Quijote name was in use by a local restaurant at the time. Since then, all Don Quijote stores around the region have also used Singapore's "Don Don Donki" name due to brand recognition. Don Quijote subsequently opened a second store at the 100AM Mall in Tanjong Pagar on June 14, 2018. Don Quijote planned to have 5 stores in Singapore by the end of 2019 and 10 stores at the end of 2020, a target that was met.

A third store was opened at City Square Mall in Singapore on January 11, 2019 with a fourth at Novena Square on May 8, 2019. A mini store in Singapore was located at Changi Airport's Terminal 3 under the Sweet Potato Factory concept, which eventually closed on September 13, 2020. A store location was announced in June 2019 at Clarke Quay Central and opened on August 2, 2019, increasing the total to five stores. Two more stores opened at Jem (sixth) and JCube (seventh) in Jurong East on November 29, 2019 and January 15, 2020 respectively. On October 30, 2020, an eighth store opened at the Harbourfront Centre. A ninth store opened at NTUC Downtown East in Pasir Ris on April 15, 2021. On June 25, 2021, a tenth store opened at Suntec City.

In September 2021, Donki announced that it would open two more stores, one at Tampines 1 (the 11th, which opened on October 22, 2021), and the 12th in the North-East Region of the country, eventually revealed to be Waterway Point. In January 2022, it was announced that Donki will open at Jewel Changi Airport. It will be an aviation and travel themed outlet, including a dedicated sake corner and an open-concept kitchen. Two more stores at Northpoint City (13th) in Yishun and Jurong Point (14th) in Jurong West opened on 6 October 2022 and 17 November 2022 respectively. The store at Jewel (15th) is to open on 20 December 2022.

Singapore has the largest amount of Don Quijote stores outside of the Japanese home islands. In late 2021, store strategy division director Mak Hanawa stated that Don Quijote plans to eventually have "20 to 30 stores" throughout Singapore.

Founder
The founder of Don Quijote, Takao Yasuda, along with his family, also lives in Singapore, specifically at Sentosa. They are permanent residents of Singapore, and he also revealed that his son had also served the country's National Service (NS).

Hong Kong

 	
Inspired by the success in Singapore, the company also expanded to Hong Kong. These stores have also adopted the Don Don Donki branding that was first established in Singapore. Don Don Donki initially has five outlets in the special administrative region, one at Mira Place 2 in Tsim Sha Tsui, one at OP Mall in Tsuen Wan, one at Pearl City in Causeway Bay, one at 100QRC in Central, and one at Monterey Place in Tseung Kwan O. Four more outlets opened subsequently, with one store at the Island Resort Mall in Siu Sai Wan in February 2021, one at TMT Plaza in Tuen Mun in July 2021. one at Amoy Plaza in January 2022, and another store opened at Fashion World in The Whampoa in August 2022. Another store is expected to open at Plaza Hollywood in Diamond Hill in 2023.

Thailand

The chain currently consists of six stores in Thailand, the first store in Thailand opened on February 22, 2019 in the Thonglor area of Bangkok. one in Seacon Square (opened October 1, 2021), one at the MBK Center (opened December 21, 2021), one in Seacon Bangkae (opened June 20, 2022),  one at J-Park Sriracha Nihon Mura in Si Racha, Chonburi. (opened September 9, 2022), and one in Thaniya Plaza on Si Lom Road. (opened January 23, 2023),
with one at The Market Shopping Mall in Ratchaprasong closed on September 4, 2022.

Taiwan
On 19 January 2021, the first Don Don Donki store in Taiwan was opened in the Ximending Shopping District, Taipei. The three-floor outlet is open 24 hours a day and is located in close proximity to Ximen metro station. It attracted more than 500 people who lined up in front of the outlet before its grand opening Tuesday.

On 20 January 2022, the second Don Don Donki store in Taiwan opened in the Zhongxiao Xinsheng district of Taipei. At , the second store is an underground single-floor store. The store is located in close proximity to the Zhongxiao Xinsheng metro station.

Malaysia
On 19 March 2021, the first Don Don Donki store in Malaysia was opened in Lot 10 of Bukit Bintang, Kuala Lumpur. A second store was then opened on 9 December 2021 at Tropicana Gardens Mall in the Petaling Jaya district of Selangor, spanning across two levels of the mall. A third store opened on 15 January 2022 at Mitsui Shopping Park LaLaport mall located at Bukit Bintang City Centre. The store also announced that it plans to open 11 outlets by 2026.

Macau
Don Don Donki opened its first store in Macau on 9 September 2021, at Fai Chi Kei.

Guam
After breaking ground in February 2020, Don Don Donki was expected to open on Guam in the village of Tamuning during September 2021. However, due to delays with visas for H-2B workers, cost increases, and building supply shortage the store is now expected to open around July or August 2023.

Theme song
Don Quijote is known for the distinctive song that plays in its stores. An English and Cantonese version has also been released, the English version also having a remake under the "Don Don Donki" name to accommodate for the outlets in Singapore.

Incidents

Arson 
In December 2004, four stores in the Kantō area were damaged or destroyed by arson attacks. Three store employees, Morio Oshima, 39, Mai Koishi, 20, and Maiko Sekiguchi, 19, died in the first arson incident. In 2007, Noriko Watanabe, 49, was found guilty of setting the fires and sentenced to life imprisonment. Don Quijote received harsh criticism at the time for poor store layout that made it difficult to find exits.

Roller coaster 
In 2005, Don Quijote began building a "half-pipe" roller coaster on the roof of its eight-story Roppongi store. Roppongi is a heavily populated area in the core of Tokyo, and many residents and businesses were upset with the idea of having a roller coaster in their neighborhood because of the spectacle, noise and crowds it would likely create. The project was completed in 2006 but due to increasing pressure from concerned groups in the area it was never operated. As of 2019, the structure has been removed.

Osaka stabbing incident 
On January 4, 2020, a woman was arrested for attacking a Chinese tourist at a Don Quijote branch in Umeda, Osaka. Miki Matsuoka, 34, of Takamatsu, Kagawa, slashed and stabbed the tourist on a staircase in the store. While being questioned, she stated that she had "bought a kitchen knife to kill someone" and she did not like the attitude of the tourist.

Overseas assets 
Don Quijote purchased the Marukai Japanese chain stores in the United States in 2013, splitting it into Marukai and Tokyo Central Markets chains.

References

External links

 Official website

Retail companies established in 1980
Companies listed on the Tokyo Stock Exchange
Consumer electronics retailers of Japan
Department stores of Japan
Department stores of Singapore
Department stores of Thailand
Department stores of Taiwan
Japanese brands
Retail companies based in Tokyo
Supermarkets of Japan
Discount stores of Japan
Grocery stores in Hawaii
Japanese companies established in 1980